Hinarere Taputu (born in Tahiti, France) is a French model and beauty pageant titleholder who was the 1st Runner-Up of Miss France 2015 contest and competed at Miss World 2015.

Personal life
Taputu lives in Tahiti.

Pageantry

Miss France 2015
On 29 June 2014, she went on to be crowned Miss Tahiti 2014 in Papeete and received the right to represent Tahiti in Miss France 2015. She placed as first runner up at the Miss France 2015. She is the third consecutive 1st Runner-Up from Tahiti.

Miss World 2015
As Miss World France 2015, Taputu competed at the Miss World 2015 where she made the top 11. She placed in the Top 24 of the Miss World Sport special event challenge as a member of the Blue Team.

References

External links
  Official site

1990 births
People from Tahiti
French beauty pageant winners
Living people
Tahitian women
Miss World 2015 delegates